Matricin is a sesquiterpene. It can be extracted from flower of chamomille (Matricaria chamomilla). Matricin is colorless.

Chamazulene, a blue-violet derivative of azulene, found in a variety of plants including in chamomile (Matricaria chamomilla), wormwood (Artemisia absinthium) and yarrow (Achillea millefolium) is biosynthesized from matricin.

References 

Sesquiterpenes
Dienes
Acetate esters
Tertiary alcohols
Anthemideae
Heterocyclic compounds with 3 rings
Oxygen heterocycles